Luis Alberto Bueno (born May 22, 1969) is a (presumed) retired Cuban Track and Field athlete, known primarily for being a Junior long jumper.

Career

He currently holds the World Best in the Youth Division, at 8.25 m set as a 17-year-old while winning the 1986 Ibero-American Championships September 28, 1986 in Havana.   It made him the number 8 jumper in the world that year.
 
Two years later he improved his personal record to 8.28 m at age 19, which stands as the third best performer in the Junior Division, only behind 8.34 m by Randy Williams while winning the 1972 Summer Olympics and the 2012 improvement to 8.35 by Sergey Morgunov of Russia. His age 17 jump would also attain the same status, making it that much more exceptional. As a point of comparison, his 8.28 m was marginally better than Larry Myricks jumped to get the bronze medal at the 1988 Olympics two months later, but Cuba boycotted the Olympics in Seoul, South Korea that year. That year he  also won the CAC Junior championships, and the 1988 World Junior Championships in Sudbury, Ontario, Canada.

As an open division athlete, he ranked #8 in world in 1990  but since then no elite results have been found. IAAF still lists his Junior best as his personal record.

Achievements

References

1969 births
Cuban male long jumpers
Living people